Assir can refer to:
'Asir Region, Saudi Arabia
Assir (biblical figure), a minor figure in the Bible, from the stars